Lamprochernes nodosus is a species of arachnid belonging to the family Chernetidae.

It is native to Europe.

References

Chernetidae